Swami Harballabh was a Hindustani classical vocalist and a saint. In 1875, he established the first Hindustani classical music festival in the world, known as Harballabh Sangeet Sammelan.

He was born to an affluent family at a village in Bajwara. He was a student of Swami Tulja Gir, who encouraged him to practice art and music. The place where Swami Hariballabh used to sing became a Kashi for musicians and players of classical music.

References

Bhajan singers
Hindustani singers